Smith Branch may refer to:

Smith Branch (Clear Fork), a stream in Missouri
Smith Branch (Iron County, Missouri), a stream in Missouri
Smith Branch (Willow Fork), a stream in Missouri